Stefano Anzi (born 21 May 1949) is a retired Italian alpine skier who specialized in the downhill event. He competed at the 1972 Winter Olympics and finished in 11th place. Anzi had three podium positions at individual world cup stages: first and third in 1971 and second in 1974.

The twins Anzi and Besson
.
In the 1970s the legend of two skiers of the valanga azzurra (blue avalanche) was born, Stefano Anzi and Giuliano Besson who were nicknamed i gemelli (the twins) because on two occasions they concluded an important downhill race in the same position, on 7 February 1972 at the 1972 Winter Olympics in Sapporo, Japan both finished in 11th place ex-aequo and on 26 January 1974 both finished in second place still ex-aequo on the legendary Streiff in Kitzbuehl, Austria in a World Cup race.

World Cup results
Anzi boasts three podiums in the World Cup.
Podium

Olympic results

See also
 Giuliano Besson (his sporty twin and than firm)

References

External links
 
 AnziBesson

1949 births
Living people
Italian male alpine skiers
Olympic alpine skiers of Italy
Alpine skiers at the 1972 Winter Olympics
20th-century Italian people